Wilhelm von Wedell-Piesdorf (20 May 1837 in Frankfurt (Oder) – 11 July 1915 in Berlin) was a German politician for German Conservative Party.

Biography
From 1879 to 1885 he was a conservative member of the Prussian House of Representatives. From 1884 he was a member of the Reichstag for the Free Conservative Party, of which he became the president in the same year, until he was made minister of the royal household by Kaiser Wilhelm II in 1888. From 1885 he was a member of the Prussian House of Lords, and became its president in 1912.

He was a member of the student fraternity Corps Saxo-Borussia Heidelberg. From 1910 to 1937 the Wedellplatz in Berlin-Friedrichsfelde was named after him.

Honours
  Kingdom of Prussia:
 Knight of Honour of the Johanniter Order, 1877; Knight of Justice, 1884
 Knight of the Order of the Red Eagle, 2nd Class with Oak Leaves, 18 January 1886; 1st Class with Crown, 12 June 1892
 Commander's Cross of the Royal House Order of Hohenzollern, with Star, 27 January 1893
 Knight of the Order of the Black Eagle, 15 June 1898; with Collar, 17 January 1899
   Austria-Hungary: Grand Cross of the Austrian Imperial Order of Leopold, 1889
 : Grand Cross of the Merit Order of Philip the Magnanimous, 26 January 1893
 : Grand Cross of the Royal Norwegian Order of Saint Olav, 15 December 1906
 : Grand Cross of the Albert Order, with Golden Star, 1893
 : Commander Grand Cross of the Royal Order of the Polar Star, 31 August 1888
 : Grand Cross of the Order of the Württemberg Crown, 1892

References

Members of the Prussian House of Representatives
Members of the Prussian House of Lords
German Conservative Party politicians
1837 births
1915 deaths
Commanders Grand Cross of the Order of the Polar Star
Wedel family